Zoltán Rockenbauer (born 4 January 1960) is a Hungarian ethnologist, art historian and politician, who served as Minister of Culture between 2000 and 2002. His father was the hiker, film editor Pál Rockenbauer, the creator of the Hungarian television nature films.

Personal life
He is married. His wife is Ágnes Kilincsányi.

Honours
 Ordre national du Mérite, Knight (Chevalier) (1999)
 Ordre national de la Légion d'honneur, Grand Officer (Grand Officier) (2001)

Publications

Monographs
 Ta’aroa – Tahiti mitológia. A primitív népek lírai költészete. Budapest, 1994, Századvég; 2002, Osiris. 300 o. 
 Nemzetpolitika '88–'98. (Társszerzők: Csaba Lőrincz, Zsolt Németh, Viktor Orbán). Budapest, 1998, Osiris.
 Kotta és paletta. Művek, művészek, múzsák. Budapest, 2001. Corvina – Európai Utas. 
 Márffy és múzsái. Budapest, 2003, Ernst Múzeum. 
 Márffy. . Életműkatalógus / Catalogue raisonné / Complete work. Budapest/Paris, 2006, Makláry Artworks. [with English and French summary] 
 Márffy. Budapest, 2008, Corvina. (Magyar mesterek). 
 A halandó múzsa. Ady özvegye, Babits szereleme, Márffy hitvese. Budapest, 2009, Noran. 
 A másik Csinszka. Márffy Ödön múzsája / Other Csinszka. Muse of Ödön Márffy. Debrecen, 2010, Modem. [Ed. bilingual: Hungarian and English]. 
 Márffy és Csinszka. Márffy Ödön festészete a két világháború között. / The paintings of Ödön Márffy between the First and Second World War. Balatonfüred: Vaszary Villa, 2010. [Ed. bilingual: Hungarian and English]. 
 Dialogue de Fauves /Dialoog onder Fauves / Dialog among Fauves. Hungarian Fauvism (1904–1914). Ed. Gergely Barki, Zoltán Rockenbauer. Bruxelles – Milano, Silvana editorale, 2010. [Ed. trilingual: French, English, Dutch]. 
 Matzon Ákos – Relief. Budapest, Faur Zsófia Galéria és Könyvkiadó. 2012. [Ed. trilingual: Hungarian, English, German]. 
 Die Acht. Ungarns Highway in die Moderne. Ed. Gergely Barki, Evelyn Benesch, Zoltán Rockenbauer. Wien, Deutscher Kunstverlag, 2012. 
 Allegro Barbaro, Béla Bartók et la modernité hongroise 1905–1920. Ed. Gergely Barki, Claire Bernardi, Zoltán Rockenbauer. Paris, Édition Hazan – Musée d’Orsay. 2013. 
 Erik Mátrai. Orb 02.2. Chiesa di San Lio, Venezia. Budapest, Műcsarnok–Kunsthalle. 2013. 
 Apacs művészet. Adyzmus a festészetben és a kubista Bartók (1900–1919). Budapest, Noran–Libro, 2014. 
 Deske.hu. Ed.: Rockenbauer Zoltán, Váli Dezső. Budapest, Műcsarnok–Kunsthalle. 2014.

Exhibitions
 Márffy Ödön és múzsái. Ernst Múzeum, 2003. (conception)
 Magyar Vadak Párizstól Nagybányáig (1904–1914). Magyar Nemzeti Galéria, 2006. (member of the scientific group preparing the exhibition)
 A másik Csinszka. Márffy Ödön múzsája. Debrecen, MODEM, 25 February – 23 May 2010 (curator)
 Szín, fény, ragyogás. Budapest, KOGART ház, 1 April – 1 August 2010 (curator)
 Márffy és Csinszka. Márffy Ödön festészete a két világháború között./ The paintings of Ödön Márffy between the First and Second World War. Balatonfüred, Vaszary Villa: 20 November 2010 – 24 April 2011 (curator)
 Dialogue de Fauves. Bruxelles, L’Hôtel de Ville: 2 December 2010 – 21 March 2011 (co-curator)
 Nyolcak. Cézanne és Matisse bűvöletében. Centenáriumi kiállítás. The Eight (Nyolcak). Pécs, Janus Pannonius Múzeum: 10 December 2010 – 27 March 2011 (co- curator)
 Nyolcak. The Eight (Nyolcak). Budapest, Museum of Fine Arts, 17 May – 16 September 2011 (co-curator) – virtual tour
 Die Acht. A Nyolcak. Ungarns Highway in die Moderne. Wien, Bank Austria Kunstforum: 12 September 2012. – 2 December 2012. (co-curator)
 Allegro Barbaro. Béla Bartók et la modernité hongroise (1905–1920). Paris, Musée d'Orsay, 15 October 2013. – 5 January 2014. (co-curator)
 Váli Dezső: deske.hu. Budapest, Műcsarnok–Kunsthalle: 12 December 2014. – 1 February 2015. február 1. (curator) – virtual tour

References

 Biography
 Biography

1960 births
Living people
Hungarian people of Austrian descent
French people of German descent
Culture ministers of Hungary
Members of the National Assembly of Hungary (1990–1994)
Members of the National Assembly of Hungary (1994–1998)
Members of the National Assembly of Hungary (1998–2002)
Members of the National Assembly of Hungary (2002–2006)